"Miniskirt" is a song by South Korean girl group AOA, serving as the lead single for the group's fifth single album of the same name. Written and produced by Brave Brothers, it was released physically and digitally on January 16, 2014 by FNC Entertainment., member Youkyung didn’t participate in the single album release due to the restrictions reasons.
 
The song was AOA's commercial breakthrough, reaching number 11 on South Korea's Gaon Digital Chart, making it their first top twenty entry. It was the 32nd best-performing single of 2014 in the country and has sold over 1,360,578 digital downloads as of 2015. It also earned AOA their first music show win on February 9, 2014.

A Japanese remake of the song was released as AOA's debut single in Japan on October 1, 2014.

Release
The music video and single were released on January 16. On January 26, AOA released an extended cut music video.

Japanese version
On July 31, 2014, it was revealed that AOA would be entering the Japanese market on October 1 with a Japanese version of "Miniskirt". On September 7, the short version of the Japanese music video was released. On September 10, the full music video was released.

Promotion
The promotions for the song "Miniskirt" started on January 16, 2014, on M! Countdown. The song was also promoted on the shows Music Bank, Music Core and Inkigayo. On February 9, AOA won their first music show award on Inkigayo. Seolhyun was unable to perform with the group in these performances due to a leg injury.

On July 11, 2014, it was revealed that AOA would be performing at the Japanese music festival A-Nation held on August 17 in Yoyogi National Gymnasium in Tokyo, Japan, as the only girl group from South Korea.

On August 12, 2014, it was confirmed that AOA would perform at "Tokyo Runway 2014" which was held on September 7 at the Makuhari Messe Event Hall.  AOA appeared as guest performers.

Track listing

Charts

Weekly charts

Year-end charts

Oricon chart

Sales

References

External links
 
 
 

AOA (group) songs
2014 singles
Korean-language songs
2014 songs
Dance-pop songs
Universal Music Japan singles
Songs written by Brave Brothers
FNC Entertainment singles